Red Snow is a 1952 American adventure film directed by Boris Petroff and Harry S. Franklin and starring Guy Madison, Mala, Carole Mathews, Gloria Saunders and Lee Frederick. The film's action takes place in Alaska. It was part of a string of anti-communist films made around this time.

Plot
Lieutenant Johnson, a U.S. Air Force pilot, on the tip of Alaska, a few miles from the Bering Straits from Siberia, helps foil a Soviet plot to test a few secret weapon by loyal Alaskan Eskimos. He is aided by Sergeant Koovuk, an Alaska native Eskimo also in the U.S. military service. Along the way there is an ice-floe evacuation, an air-ice rescue and a fight with a polar bear.

Cast
 Guy Madison as Lt. Phil Johnson  
 Mala as Sgt. Koovuk (as Ray Mala)
 Carole Mathews as Lt. Jane (as Carole Matthews)
 Gloria Saunders as Alak  
 Lee Frederick as Major Bennett (as Robert Peyton)
 John Bryant as Enemy Pilot Alex  
 Richard Vath as Maj. Elia  
 Philip Ahn as Tuglu, the spy (as Phillip Ahn)
 Tony Benroy as Cpl. Savick  
 Gordon Barnes as Capt. Mack MacLoflin 
 John Bleifer as Commissar Volgan  
 Gene Roth as Colonel Duboff  
 Muriel Maddox as Nurse Ruth  
 Robert Bice as Chief Nanu  
 Renny McEvoy as Sgt. Spike Koops  
 Bert Arnold as Riggs  
 Richard Emory as Lt. Stone  
 Dick Pinner as Long  (as Richard Pinner)
 George Pembroke as Maj. Slavin  
 Robert Carson as Debriefing General  
 William Fletcher as Kresnick  
 Richard Barron as Russian Officer

See also
 List of American films of 1952

References

Bibliography
 Phillip L. Gianos. Politics and Politicians in American Film. Greenwood Publishing Group, 1999.

External links
 

1952 films
1950s action adventure films
1950s action thriller films
Columbia Pictures films
Films set in Alaska
American action adventure films
American action thriller films
American black-and-white films
1950s English-language films
1950s American films